Hired and Fired is a 1916 American silent comedy film featuring Oliver Hardy.

Cast
 Bobby Burns as Pokes
 Walter Stull as Jabbs
Ethel Marie Burton
Florence McLaughlin
 Oliver Hardy (as Babe Hardy)

See also
 List of American films of 1916

External links

1916 films
1916 short films
American silent short films
American black-and-white films
1916 comedy films
Silent American comedy films
American comedy short films
1910s American films